Ricardo dos Santos Nascimento (born 7 February 1987), simply known as Ricardo Nascimento is a Brazilian footballer playing for Royal AM F.C. as a defender.

Club career
After an unsuccessful spell at Palmeiras, he joined Olé Brasil in 2008. Nascimento spent the following seasons on loan at Penafiel followed by Portimonense. He then returned to Brazil before embracing Romanian football with Astra Giurgiu.
 
He again spent the 2012–2013 season with Portimonense. It was followed by another loan spell with Moreirense. In 2014, he entered Primeira Liga with Académica.

Honours

Mamelodi Sundowns
South African Premier Division: 2017-18, 2018-19, 2019-20, 2020-21
Nedbank Cup: 2019-20
Telkom Knockout: 2019
CAF Super Cup: 2017.

References

External links
 
 

1987 births
Living people
Sportspeople from Bahia
Brazilian footballers
Association football defenders
People from Ilhéus
Sociedade Esportiva Palmeiras players
F.C. Penafiel players
Portimonense S.C. players
Comercial Futebol Clube (Ribeirão Preto) players
FC Astra Giurgiu players
Moreirense F.C. players
Associação Académica de Coimbra – O.A.F. players
Mamelodi Sundowns F.C. players
Campeonato Brasileiro Série A players
Liga Portugal 2 players
Primeira Liga players
Liga I players
Brazilian expatriate footballers
Expatriate footballers in Portugal
Brazilian expatriate sportspeople in Portugal
Expatriate soccer players in South Africa
Brazilian expatriate sportspeople in South Africa